Purappadu may refer to:

Purappadu (1983 film) Indian Malayalam language film directed by Rajeevnath
Purappadu (1990 film) Indian Malayalam language film directed by Jeassy